HMS Bredah or Breda was a 70-gun third rate ship of the line of the English Royal Navy, launched at Harwich in 1679.

Having fought in the Battle of Beachy Head in 1690, Bredah was destroyed by an accidental fire later that year after participating in the Siege of Cork.

Design and construction 
Bredah was one of the new third rate ships of the line ordered on 9 July 1678 under the 1677 naval programme, known as the Thirty Ships Programme, which was requested by Samuel Pepys in response to the Dutch and French navies surpassing England in the total number of ships of the line despite the English victory in the Third Anglo-Dutch War.

She carried 70 guns with 13 gunports on the sides of each deck and had a crew of 460 men, reduced from a planned 470. According to the 1685 gun establishment, on her lower gun deck, Bredah carried 22 demi-cannon and four culverin guns. Her upper deck originally had twenty-six twelve-pounder guns. There were 14 sakers on the forecastle and the quarterdeck, as well as four 3-pounders on the roundhouse.

Built under the supervision of naval architect Master Shipwright Isaac Betts at Harwich Dockyard, Bredah was launched on 26 September 1679, part of the second batch of eight third rates of the 1677 programme.

Service 

Bredah was commissioned on 26 July 1679 under the command of Captain John Moore, who died on 17 November of that year, so that she could be moved to Chatham Dockyard. She was recommissioned by 30 May 1689, when she was commanded by Captain Christopher Mason. In 1690 she was commanded by Captain Matthew Tennant and fought at the Battle of Beachy Head on 30 June of that year during the Nine Years' War as part of the English rear (the blue squadron). Bredah went on to participate in the Siege of Cork later that year.

She was anchored at Spike Island, Cork with
a full complement of 400 aboard, including troops and 160 Jacobite prisoners, captured after the Siege of Cork, when a gunpowder
explosion occurred on 12 October 1690. She took fire and blew up. Jacobite prisoner Colonel John Barrett, who escaped, was considered to have deliberately blown up the ship. There were nine other survivors; Tennant was among those killed.

Notes

References

Lavery, Brian (2003) The Ship of the Line - Volume 1: The development of the battlefleet 1650-1850. Conway Maritime Press. .

Ships of the line of the Royal Navy
1670s ships
Ships built in Harwich